Oasis Academy MediaCityUK is an academy in Salford Quays, Salford, Greater Manchester, England. The co-educational school for 11-16 year olds is part of the Oasis Community Learning multi-academy trust group. The buildings date from 2012. It has had a turbulent history- but it has stabilised, and is classed by Ofsted as a "Good" school.

History
The Academy has its origins in Hope Hall School which was located on Prestwood Road in Pendleton. It was more recently renamed Hope High School before it reopened as Oasis Academy MediaCityUK in September 2008.

In September 2012, the Academy moved to a new site at Salford Quays. In the process, it made 14 teachers involuntarily redundant. Students rioted in support of their teachers and some teachers staged a walkout. Avis Gilmore of the National Union of Teachers said, "As soon as we became aware of the situation, we asked for a meeting to resolve issues without the need to go forward with the strike, but the responses were that they (the management) would not contemplate revisiting the procedure." The NASUWT, as well as supporting their members, commented "that educational standards could be compromised. Students are going to lose their teachers part way through the academic year."

Patrick Ottley-O'Connor, the head teacher at the time mid year in 2013. Patrick Rice became the interim headmaster.

It was deemed "Inadequate" in 2014, and put into special measures. Ofsted identified that students enter "with standards in reading, writing and mathematics which are significantly below average" and that "too few students make the progress [expected of them]" Ofsted's suggesting for improvement included stabilising staffing, planning to develop the students rather than just completing tasks, providing opportunities to all students at Key Stage 3 to improve at maths, to provide activities to challenge the more able, to challenge and eradicate poor behaviour, and for management to develop monitoring systems.

Fiona O’Sullivan was appointed principal in November 2014, and expelled nine students, recruited a new leadership team, and brought in 6 extra teachers in a turnaround bid. Weekly staff training was put in place and assistance was accepted from St Patrick's Roman Catholic High School in Eccles.

In its most recent Ofsted inspection in June 2016, the school was rated "Good". 80% of the staff had changed and systems were in place, students felt that the school was safe and calmer.

Description
Oasis Academy MediaCityUK is part of the Oasis Community Learning group, an evangelical Christian charity. The trust have guided forty schools out of special measures. 19 per cent of the 52 Oasis academies classified as failing. The trust's founder Reverend Steve Chalke says "Turning round a school is sometimes a quick fix, it really, truly is. And sometimes it’s a really long, hard, hard job".

Oasis has a long term strategy for enhancing the performance of its schools. Firstly it has devised a standard curriculum, that each school can safely adopt knowing it will deliver the National Curriculum. Secondly it has invested in staff training so they are focused on improving the outcomes for the students, and thirdly, through its Horizons scheme it is providing each member of staff and student with a tablet.

Curriculum
Virtually all maintained schools and academies follow the National Curriculum, and there success is judged on how well they succeed in delivering a 'broad and balanced curriculum'. Schools endeavour to get all students to achieve the English Baccalaureate(EBACC) qualification- this must include core subjects a modern or ancient foreign language, and either History or Geography.

The academy operates a three-year, Key Stage 3 where all the core National Curriculum subjects are taught. This is a transition period from primary to secondary education, that builds on the skills, knowledge and understanding gained at primary school, and introduces youngsters who are starting from a lower than average base to wider, robust and challenging programmes of study needed to gain qualifications at Key Stage 4.

At Key Stage 4 the focus is on the EBACC, and there are daily Maths, English and Science lessons- plus some options. Spanish is the taught Modern Language. 

Lessons all follow the same structure. A immediate activity, to get the students focused and allow the teacher 'set up time'. The body of the lesson uses the tag: I do, we do, you do. 
I do is the teacher exposition, where the students are expected to 'SLANT'. 
We do is where the teacher teaches by question and answer with the student. 
You do is where the students work through examples on their own. 
The lesson is concluded with a plenary, where students are reminded of what they have learnt and to celebrate their achievements. SLANT is sit up, lean forward, ask and answer questions, nod your head and track the speaker.

Results
In 2018, Oasis Academy MediaCityUK announced a 60% pass rate of pupils gaining grades 4–9 in English & Maths combined. 74% achieved grade 4–9 in English and 67% achieved grade 4–9 in Maths.

References

External links
 The school website

Academies in Salford
Secondary schools in Salford
MediaCityUK